The , or IRE for short, was signed by Emperor Meiji of Japan on 30 October 1890 to articulate government policy on the guiding principles of education on the Empire of Japan. The 315 character document was read aloud at all important school events, and students were required to study and memorize the text.

Background
Following the Meiji Restoration, the leadership of the Meiji government felt the need to emphasize the common goals of rapid modernization (westernization) with support and legitimization of the political system centered on the imperial institution. In the 1870s and 1880s, Motoda Nagazane and other conservatives pushed for a revival of the principles of Confucianism as a guide for education and public morality; however, Inoue Kowashi and other proponents of the 'modernization' of Japan felt that this would encourage a return to the old feudal order, and pushed for an "emperor-centered" philosophy. Prime Minister Yamagata Aritomo authorized the drafting of the Rescript, which was a compromise written largely by Inoue Kowashi with input from Motoda Nagazane and others.

After it was issued, the Rescript was distributed to all schools in the country, together with a portrait of Emperor Meiji.

Text 
The text in Classical Japanese reads:朕󠄁惟フニ我カ皇祖皇宗國ヲ肇󠄁ムルコト宏遠󠄁ニ德ヲ樹ツルコト深厚ナリ我カ臣民克ク忠ニ克ク孝ニ億兆心ヲ一ニシテ世世厥ノ美ヲ濟セルハ此レ我カ國體ノ精華ニシテ敎育ノ淵源亦實ニ此ニ存ス爾臣民父母ニ孝ニ兄弟ニ友ニ夫婦󠄁相和シ朋友相信シ恭儉己レヲ持シ博󠄁愛衆ニ及󠄁ホシ學ヲ修メ業ヲ習󠄁ヒ以テ智能ヲ啓󠄁發シ德器󠄁ヲ成就シ進󠄁テ公󠄁益󠄁ヲ廣メ世務ヲ開キ常ニ國憲ヲ重シ國法ニ遵󠄁ヒ一旦緩󠄁急󠄁アレハ義勇󠄁公󠄁ニ奉シ以テ天壤無窮󠄁ノ皇運󠄁ヲ扶翼󠄂スヘシ是ノ如キハ獨リ朕󠄁カ忠良ノ臣民タルノミナラス又󠄂以テ爾祖󠄁先ノ遺󠄁風ヲ顯彰スルニ足ラン

斯ノ道󠄁ハ實ニ我カ皇祖皇宗ノ遺󠄁訓ニシテ子孫臣民ノ俱ニ遵󠄁守スヘキ所󠄁之ヲ古今ニ通󠄁シテ謬ラス之ヲ中外ニ施シテ悖ラス朕󠄁爾臣民ト俱ニ拳󠄁々服󠄁膺シテ咸其德ヲ一ニセンコトヲ庶󠄂幾󠄁フ

明治二十三年十月三十日

御 名 御 璽
Translated into English:Know ye, Our subjects:

Our Imperial Ancestors have founded Our Empire on a basis broad and everlasting and have deeply and firmly implanted virtue; Our subjects ever united in loyalty and filial piety have from generation to generation illustrated the beauty thereof. This is the glory of the fundamental character of Our Empire, and herein lies the source of Our education.

Ye, Our subjects, be filial to your parents, affectionate to your brothers and sisters; as husbands and wives be harmonious; as friends true; bear yourselves in modesty and moderation; extend your benevolence to all; pursue learning and cultivate arts, and thereby develop intellectual faculties and perfect moral powers; furthermore advance public good and promote common interests; always respect the Constitution and observe the laws; should emergency arise, offer yourselves courageously to the State; and thus guard and maintain the prosperity of Our Imperial Throne coeval with heaven and earth.

So shall ye not only be Our good and faithful subjects, but render illustrious the best traditions of your forefathers. The Way here set forth is indeed the teaching bequeathed by Our Imperial Ancestors, to be observed alike by Their Descendants and the subjects, infallible for all ages and true in all places. It is Our wish to lay it to heart in all reverence, in common with you, Our subjects, that we may thus attain to the same virtue.

Details
The Rescript pushed traditional ideals of Confucianism, and in many ways contributed to the rise of militarism during the 1930s and 40s. The Rescript requested of the people that they "furthermore advance public good and promote common interests; always respect the Constitution and observe the laws; should emergency arise, offer yourselves courageously to the State; and thus guard and maintain the prosperity of Our Imperial Throne coeval with heaven and earth".

The basis of the Rescript was that Japan's unique kokutai (system of government) was based on a historic bond between benevolent rulers and loyal subjects, and that the fundamental purpose of education was to cultivate virtues, especially loyalty and filial piety.

After the end of World War II in Asia following the surrender of Japan, the American occupation authorities forbade the formal reading of the Imperial Rescript in schools, and the National Diet officially abolished it on 19 June 1948.

Kikuchi Dairoku and the Imperial Rescript on Education
In 1907, Kikuchi Dairoku was invited by the University of London to give lectures on education from the middle of February for about five months. The central focus of his lectures was the Imperial Rescript on Education. The request for the lectures was initially communicated to Hayashi Tadasu, then ambassador in London (from December 1905). At first Sawayanagi Matsutaro was to give the lectures, but he was recalled when in Rome on the way to London and Kikuchi gave the lectures instead. As a preparation for the lectures he translated the Imperial Rescript into English.

See also

 Education in the Empire of Japan
 Ho an den: A temple or shrine-like small building that housed the Imperial Rescript on Education, together with a photograph of the Emperor and the Empress.
 Shotouka-Chiri official geography text

Sources
 Japanese Students at Cambridge University in the Meiji Era, 1868–1912: Pioneers for the Modernization of Japan, by Noboru Koyama, translated by Ian Ruxton September 2004).

References

Education laws and guidelines in Japan
Empire of Japan
Emperor Meiji
1890 in Japan
Rescripts
Japanese Imperial rescripts